Pouteria kaieteurensis is a species of plant in the family Sapotaceae. It is endemic to Guyana.

References

Flora of Guyana
kaieteurensis
Vulnerable plants
Endemic flora of Guyana
Taxonomy articles created by Polbot